Joseph Haydar (born 18 November 1938) is an Australian weightlifter. He competed in the men's middleweight event at the 1964 Summer Olympics.

References

External links
 

1938 births
Living people
Australian male weightlifters
Olympic weightlifters of Australia
Weightlifters at the 1964 Summer Olympics
Place of birth missing (living people)
20th-century Australian people
21st-century Australian people